In France, the Operational Defence of the Territory (Défense opérationnelle du territoire, DOT) is according to the Code of Defence, the participation of the French Armed Forces "To maintain the freedom and continuity of action of the Government, as well as to safeguard the organs essential to the defense of the nation."

The integrated civil-military concept was first put in place in 1959. It is defined as the mission entrusted to the Armed Forces on French territory:

 Protection of military installations at all times 
 Ensure the protection of the national territory and oppose a possible enemy inside it 
 Organize military resistance operations in the event of an invasion.

In 1984, Isby and Kamps wrote that the Défense Opérationnelle du Territoire term remained in use despite the command having been disbanded in the 1970s.

Cold War structure 
information is circa 1989

1st Military Region 
 Headquarters Paris
GMR 1 (Saint-Germain-en-Laye)
101RT (Montlhï¿½ry)
 6e Régiment de Chasseurs (Réserve) (6e RCh), Rambouillet, (with AML-60 and AML-90)
 12e Régiment de Dragons (Réserve) (12e RD), Orléans, (with AML-60 and AML-90)
 5e Régiment du Génie (Réserve) (5e RG), Versailles
 1er Groupe d’Hélicoptères Légers, Les Mureaux
 102e Brigade de Zone (Réserve) (102e BZ), Saint-Germain-en-Laye
 102e Régiment de Commandement et de Soutien (102e RCS), Versailles
 8e Régiment de Chasseurs (8e RCh), Olivet, (with AML-60 and AML-90)
 70e Régiment d'Infanterie de Marine (70e RIMa), Montlhéry
 93e Régiment d'Infanterie (93e RI), Beynes
 152e Compagnie du Génie (152e CG), Versailles
 162e Compagnie du Génie (162e CG), Versailles
 12e Division Militaire Territoriale (Versailles)
 54e Régiment d'Infanterie de Marine (Réserve) (54e RIMa), Pontoise
CM 5 (Pontoise) - CM 421 (Les-Lilas)
 13e Division Militaire Territoriale (Tours)
 32e Régiment (RCD) (Le-Ruchard)
CM 32 (Le-Ruchard) - CM 90 (Chateauroux) - CM 108 (Pannes)

2nd Military Region 
 2e Région militaire (2e RM), Lille
 5e Régiment de Hussards (Réserve) (5e RH), Laon, (with AML-60 and AML-90)
 28e Régiment d’Infanterie (Réserve) (28e RI), Évreux
 33e Régiment d’Infanterie (Réserve) (33e RI), Saint-Omer
 73e Régiment d’Infanterie (Réserve) (73e RI), Aire-sur-la-Lys	
 84e Régiment d’Infanterie (Réserve) (84e RI), Cambrai	
 127e Régiment d’Infanterie (Réserve) (127e RI), Laon
 2e Régiment de Transmission de Zone de Défense (Réserve), (2e RTZD), Lille
 52e Régiment de Transmission, (52e RT), Lille
 102e Régiment du Train de Zone (Réserve)(102e RTZ), Arras
 Bataillon des canonniers sédentaires (Réserve) Lille, (Bofors 40 mm gun)
 2e Groupe d’Hélicoptères Légers, Dax
 108e Brigade de Zone (108e BZ), Amiens
 108e Régiment de Commandement et de Soutien (108e RCS), Amiens
 18e Régiment de Chasseurs (18e RCh), Arras, (with AML-60 and AML-90)
 45e Régiment d'Infanterie (45e RI), Soissons
 87e Régiment d'Infanterie (87e RI), Sissonne
 158e Compagnie du Génie (158e CG), Oissel
 168e Compagnie du Génie (168e CG), Oissel
 21e Circonscription Militaire de Défense
 243e Régiment d'Infanterie (Réserve) (243e RI), Lille
 22e Circonscription Militaire de Défense
 54e Régiment d'Infanterie (Réserve) (54e RI), Noyon
 23e Circonscription Militaire de Défense
 239e Régiment d'Infanterie (Réserve) (239e RI), Rouen

3rd Military Region 
 3e Région militaire (3e RM), Rennes
 41e Régiment d'Infanterie (41e RI), Châteaulin (70x VAB)
 19e Régiment d’Infanterie (Réserve) (19e RI), Brest
 77e Régiment d’Infanterie (Réserve) (77e RI), Fontevraud-l'Abbaye
 115e Régiment d’Infanterie (Réserve) (115e RI), Thorée-les-Pins
 118e Régiment d’Infanterie (Réserve) (118e RI), Châteaulin	
 125e Régiment d’Infanterie (Réserve) (125e RI), Poitiers
 21e Régiment du Génie (Réserve) (21e RG), Angers
 3e Régiment de Transmission de Zone de Défense (Réserve), (3e RTZD), Laval
 38e Régiment de Transmission, (38e RT), Laval
 103e Régiment du Train de Zone (Réserve)(103e RTZ), La Rochelle
 504e Groupe Antiaérien Léger (Réserve) (504e GAL), Tourouvre, (Bofors 40 mm gun)
 3e Groupe d’Hélicoptères Légers, Saint-Jacques-de-la-Lande
 109e Brigade de Zone (Réserve) (109e BZ), Saint-Malo
 109e Régiment de Commandement et de Soutien (109e RCS), Dinan
 19e Régiment de Dragons (19e RD), Vannes, (with AML-60 and AML-90)
 62e Régiment d'Infanterie (62e RI), Vannes
 117e Régiment d'Infanterie (117e RI), Le Mans
 159e Compagnie du Génie (159e CG), Angers
 169e Compagnie du Génie (169e CG), Angers
 31e Circonscription Militaire de Défense
 48e Régiment d'Infanterie (Réserve) (48e RI), Guingamp
 32e Circonscription Militaire de Défense
 2e Régiment d'Infanterie (Réserve) (2e RI), Caen
 33e Circonscription Militaire de Défense
 137e Régiment d'Infanterie (Réserve) (137e RI), Fontenay-le-Comte

4th Military Region 
 4e Région militaire (4e RM), Bordeaux
 49e Régiment d'Infanterie (Réserve) (49e RI), Bayonne
 50e Régiment d’Infanterie (Réserve) (50e RI), Périgueux
 63e Régiment d’Infanterie (Réserve) (63e RI), Limoges
 83e Régiment d’Infanterie (Réserve) (83e RI), Toulouse
 88e Régiment d’Infanterie (Réserve) (88e RI), Auch
 17e Régiment d'Artillerie (Training) (17e RA), Biscarrosse, (Bofors 40 mm gun)
 31e Régiment du Génie (Réserve) (31e RG), Castelsarrasin
 4e Régiment de Transmission de Zone de Défense (Réserve), (4e RTZD), Bordeaux
 48e Régiment de Transmission, (48e RT), Bordeaux
 104e Régiment du Train de Zone (Réserve)(104e RTZ), Brie
 4e Groupe d’Hélicoptères Légers, Martignas-sur-Jalle
 115e Brigade de Zone (Réserve) (115e BZ), Limoges
 115e Régiment de Commandement et de Soutien (115e RCS), Limoges
 9e Régiment de Chasseurs (9e RCh), Périgueux, (with AML-60 and AML-90)
 18e Régiment d'Infanterie (18e RI), Pau
 34e Régiment d'Infanterie (34e RI), Mont-de-Marsan
 165e Compagnie du Génie (165e CG), Castelsarrasin
 175e Compagnie du Génie (175e CG), Castelsarrasin
 41e Circonscription Militaire de Défense
 144e Régiment d'Infanterie (Réserve) (144e RI), Martignas-sur-Jalle
 42e Circonscription Militaire de Défense
 107e Régiment d'Infanterie (Réserve) (107e RI), Angoulême
 43e Circonscription Militaire de Défense
 100e Régiment d'Infanterie (Réserve) (100e RI), Brive-la-Gaillarde
 44e Circonscription Militaire de Défense
 15e Régiment d'Infanterie (Réserve) (15e RI), Castres

5th Military Region 
 5e Région militaire (5e RM), Lyon
 8e Régiment d'Infanterie de Marine (Réserve) (8e RIMa), Tarascon
 16e Régiment d’Infanterie (Réserve) (16e RI), Clermont-Ferrand
 38e Régiment d’Infanterie (Réserve) (38e RI), Saint-Étienne
 52e Régiment d’Infanterie (Réserve) (52e RI), Sathonay
 53e Régiment d’Infanterie (Réserve) (53e RI), Lunel
 112e Régiment d’Infanterie (Réserve) (112e RI), La Valette
 121e Régiment d’Infanterie (Réserve) (121e RI), Moulins
 15e Bataillon de Chasseurs Alpins (Réserve)(15e BCA), Barcelonnette
 22e Bataillon de Chasseurs Alpins (Réserve)(22e BCA), Briançon
 53e Bataillon de Chasseurs Alpins (Réserve)(53e BCA), Chambéry
 5e Régiment de Transmission de Zone de Défense (Réserve), (5e RTZD), Montélimar
 45e Régiment de Transmission, (45e RT), Montélimar
 105e Régiment du Train de Zone (Réserve)(105e RTZ), Vienne
 506e Groupe Antiaérien Léger (Réserve) (506e GAL), Hyères, (Bofors 40 mm gun)
 5e Groupe d’Hélicoptères Légers, Lyon
 24e Bataillon du Matériel, (24e BMAT), Saint-Priest
 127e Brigade de Zone (Réserve) (127e BZ), Grenoble
 127e Régiment de Commandement et de Soutien (127e RCS), Grenoble
 13e Régiment de Chasseurs (13e RCh), Gap, (with AML-60 and AML-90)
 67e Bataillon de Chasseurs Alpins (67e BCA)
 140e Régiment d'Infanterie Alpine (140e RIA), Varces
 177e Compagnie du Génie (177e CG), Avignon
 187e Compagnie du Génie (187e CG), Avignon
 51e Circonscription Militaire de Défense
 299e Régiment d'Infanterie (Réserve) (299e RI), Sathonay
 52e Circonscription Militaire de Défense
 292e Régiment d'Infanterie (Réserve) (292e RI), Clermont-Ferrand
 53e Circonscription Militaire de Défense
 141e Régiment d'Infanterie (Réserve) (141e RI), La Valette
 54e Circonscription Militaire de Défense
 142e Régiment d'Infanterie (Réserve) (142e RI), Béziers
 55e Circonscription Militaire de Défense
 173e Régiment d'Infanterie (Réserve) (173e RI), Bastia
 373e Régiment d'Infanterie (Réserve) (373e RI), Ajaccio

6th Military Region 
 6e Région militaire (6e RM), Metz
 56e Régiment d’Infanterie (Réserve) (56e RI), Digoin
 69e Régiment d’Infanterie (Réserve) (69e RI), Pont-Sainte-Marie
 79e Régiment d’Infanterie (Réserve) (79e RI), Saint-Avold
 89e Régiment d’Infanterie (Réserve) (89e RI), Sens
 133e Régiment d’Infanterie (Réserve) (133e RI), Bourg-en-Bresse
 59e Régiment d'Artillerie (Réserve) (59e RA), Colmar, (Bofors 40 mm gun)
 6e Régiment de Transmission de Zone de Défense (Réserve), (6e RTZD), Montigny-lès-Metz
 43e Régiment de Transmission, (43e RT), Montigny-lès-Metz
 106e Régiment du Train de Zone (Réserve)(106e RTZ), Ecrouves
 6e Groupe d’Hélicoptères Légers, Dax
 107e Brigade de Zone (Réserve) (107e BZ), Besançon
 107e Régiment de Commandement et de Soutien (107e RCS), Besançon
 10e Régiment de Chasseurs (10e RCh), Lunéville, (with AML-60 and AML-90)
 23e Régiment d'Infanterie (23e RI), Les Rousses
 149e Régiment d'Infanterie (149e RI), Lunéville
 157e Compagnie du Génie (67e CG), Besançon
 167e Compagnie du Génie (167e CG), Besançon
 110e Brigade de Zone (Réserve) (110e BZ), Châlons-en-Champagne
 110e Régiment de Commandement et de Soutien (110e RCS), Chalons sur Marne
 15e Régiment de Chasseurs (15e RCh), Thierville-sur-Meuse, (with AML-60 and AML-90)
 41e Groupe de Chasseurs (41e GC), Reims
 164e Régiment d'Infanterie (164e RI), Verdun
 160e Compagnie du Génie (160e CG), Charleville-Mézières
 170e Compagnie du Génie (170e CG), Charleville-Mézières
 61e Circonscription Militaire de Défense
 26e Régiment d'Infanterie (Réserve) (26e RI), Pont-Saint-Vincent
 62e Circonscription Militaire de Défense
 37e Régiment d'Infanterie (Réserve) (37e RI), Sarrebourg
 63e Circonscription Militaire de Défense
 106e Régiment d'Infanterie (Réserve) (106e RI), Sedan
 64e Circonscription Militaire de Défense
 10e Régiment d'Infanterie (Réserve) (10e RI), Digoin
 65e Circonscription Militaire de Défense
 60e Régiment d'Infanterie (Réserve) (60e RI), Valdahon

See also 
 Military reserve 
 National Territory Land Command (France) (post-Cold War equivalent, from 2016)

References 

http://www.tanaka-world.net/?cat=7 - structures of the French Army after 1945

French Army
National security of France
Army units and formations of France